New York's 57th State Assembly district is one of the 150 districts in the New York State Assembly. It has been represented by Democrat Phara Souffrant Forrest since 2020.

Geography 

District 57 is located in Brooklyn, comprising the neighborhoods of Fort Greene, Clinton Hill, Prospect Heights, and parts of Crown Heights and Bedford–Stuyvesant.

Representation 

District 57 was served by Roger L. Green from 1981 until June 1, 2004, when Green resigned his seat after pleading guilty to petty larceny in connection with $3,000 in false travel reimbursement claims. He was sentenced to three years' probation, fined $2,000, and had to pay $3,000 in restitution. However, he ran for the seat again a few months later and was reelected on November 2, 2004.

Green served one final term from 2005 to 2007, but then announced his retirement from the Assembly to run for Congress, a race that he lost. Hakeem Jeffries, who had challenged Green in the Democratic primary in 2000, won the Democratic primary and the general election in 2006. Jeffries served until 2013, when he retired from the Assembly to serve in Congress. 

Walter T. Mosley won the open race for the seat in 2012, and has served since 2013. Mosley has served unopposed since he was first elected, but faced his first primary challenge on June 23, 2020 against Phara Souffrant Forrest.

Recent election results

2022

2020
Assemblyman Mosley faced his first contested election since 2012 in the Democratic primary on June 23, 2020 against Phara Souffrant Forrest.

2018

2016

2014

2012

2010

References 

57
Politics of Brooklyn